The following lists events that happened during 1955 in North Vietnam.

Events

November
 November 1 - The Vietnam War begins between the South Vietnam Army and the North Vietnam Army in which the latter is allied with the Viet Cong.

References

 
North
Years of the 20th century in North Vietnam
North Vietnam
1950s in North Vietnam
North Vietnam